Patrick Hald Hougaard (born 23 May 1989) is a former motorcycle speedway rider from Denmark, who was a member of Denmark U-21 national team.

Career
Patrick Hougaard was born in Fredericia to parents Søren and Dorthe. He has two brothers Casper and Nicklas.

Hougaard won the Danish Under-21 championship in 2007, and first raced in the UK towards the end of the 2007 season, for Reading Racers. He signed for the Belle Vue Aces midway through the 2008 season on leaving school. He again won the Danish Under-21 title in 2009 and was part of the Danish team that won the under-21 team cup in 2010. He stayed with Belle Vue until the end of the 2012 season, joining Peterborough Panthers in 2013.

In December 2013 he signed to ride for Leicester Lions in their debut Elite League season in 2014. He also signed to ride in Poland for Polonia Bydgoszcz.

Speedway Grand Prix results

World Championships 

 Individual U-21 World Championship (Under-21 World Championship)
 2007 - 10th place in Semi-final 2
 2008 -  Pardubice - 8th place (8 pts)
 2009 -  Goričan - 3rd place (12+2 pts)
 Team U-21 World Championship (Under-21 Speedway World Cup)
 2005 -  Pardubice - 3rd place (2 pts)
 2006 - started in Qualifying Round 1 only
 2007 - 2nd place in Qualifying Round 1
 2008 -  Holsted - Runner-up (16 pts)
 2009 -  Gorzów Wlkp. - Runner-up (14 pts)
 2010 -  Rye House - Under-21 World Champion (11 pts)

European Championships 

 Individual European Championship
 2007 -  Wiener Neustadt - 3rd place (11 pts)
 2008 - 12th place in Semi-Final 1
 Individual U-19 European Championship
 2006 -  Goričan - 16th place (3 pts)
 2007 -  Częstochowa - 13th place (5 pts)
 2008 -  Stralsund - 4th place (11 pts)
 Team U-19 European Championship
 2008 -  Rawicz - 3rd place (13 pts)

Domestic competitions 

 Individual Danish Championship
 2005 - 11th place
 2006 - 9th place
 2007 - 9th place
 2008 - 7th place
 Individual U-21 Danish Championship
 2005 - 3rd place
 2006 - Runner-up
 2007 - Danish Champion
 2008 - Runner-up
 2009 Danish Champion
 Individual U-19 Nordic Championship
 2006 - Nordic Champion
 Danish Speedway League
 2004 - Danish Champion for team with Holsted
 2005 - Danish Champion for team with Holsted
 2006 - Danish Champion for team with Fredericia
 2007 - Danish Champion for team with Holsted
 Team Polish Championship (Speedway Ekstraliga)
 2007 - Polish Champion with Unia Leszno

See also 
 Denmark national speedway team
 List of Speedway Grand Prix riders

References 

1989 births
Living people
Danish speedway riders
Team Speedway Junior World Champions
Belle Vue Aces riders
Leicester Lions riders
Peterborough Panthers riders
Somerset Rebels riders
People from Fredericia
Sportspeople from the Region of Southern Denmark